Uladzimir Ignatik was the defending champion but lost in the second round to Ugo Humbert.

Humbert won the title after defeating Filippo Baldi 6–4, 7–6(7–3) in the final.

Seeds

Draw

Finals

Top half

Bottom half

References
Main Draw
Qualifying Draw

Internazionali di Tennis Castel del Monte - Singles
2018 Singles